Mariano Esteban Uglessich ( born 6 November 1981 in Buenos Aires) is a retired Argentine footballer who played as a defender.

Career

Vélez Sarfield, Mexico and Arsenal
He started playing at Vélez Sársfield youth divisions, and debuted professionally on 22 February 2002. He played very briefly for the Mexican League System Segunda División de México Querétaro F.C. in the first quarter of 2004, but after that returned to Vélez Sársfield. He was part of the team that won the Torneo Clausura 2005 but he hardly ever played due to being overshadowed by Fabricio Fuentes, Maximiliano Pellegrino and Hernán Pellerano.

During the 2007–08 season, after Pellegrino's departure, Uglessich was a regular starter in Vélez. On 3 February 2009, the central defender left Velez Sarsfield by mutual consent with the club. Arsenal de Sarandí signed the former Velez Sarsfield.

Spain
On 12 August 2009, he signed with Albacete Balompié. On 7 January 2010 Albacete Balompié released the Argentine defender at his request.

Back to South America: Paraguay

After the match, he played on 8 January 2010, he used his Twitter account to make racial slurs about the Brazilian Players of Santos. In 2012, he signed with Cerro Porteño, where he was champion of the Torneo de Apertura 2012.

O'Higgins

In 2013, he signed with the Chilean Club O'Higgins, where he won the Apertura 2013–14. In the tournament, he played in 12 of the 18 matches. In 2014, he won the Supercopa de Chile with the club, playing against Deportes Iquique, and failing the fifth penalty in the penalty shoot-out.

He participated with the club in the 2014 Copa Libertadores where they faced Deportivo Cali, Cerro Porteño and Lanús, being third and being eliminated in the group stage. 

He left the club in the second half of 2014, and signed with Universidad Católica del Ecuador.

Titles

Club

Vélez Sarfield
Primera División: Clausura 2005
Cerro Porteño
División Profesional: Apertura 2012
O'Higgins
Primera División: Apertura 2013–14
Supercopa de Chile: 2014

Individual

O'Higgins
Medalla Santa Cruz de Triana: 2014

References

External links
 Argentine Primera statistics
Profile at BDFA

1981 births
Living people
Argentine footballers
Argentine expatriate footballers
Argentine expatriate sportspeople in Spain
Footballers from Buenos Aires
Club Atlético Vélez Sarsfield footballers
Arsenal de Sarandí footballers
Albacete Balompié players
Club Olimpia footballers
Argentine people of Croatian descent
Cerro Porteño players
Querétaro F.C. footballers
O'Higgins F.C. footballers
Chilean Primera División players
Argentine Primera División players
Expatriate footballers in Mexico
Expatriate footballers in Chile
Expatriate footballers in Spain
Expatriate footballers in Paraguay
Association football defenders